Zenón Rolón (25 June 1856 – 13 May 1902) was an Afro Argentine musician and composer. Born in Buenos Aires, he composed approximately 80 works including operas, operettas, zarzuelas and sacred music. Rolón also founded a music publishing company which published numerous works by contemporary Argentine composers. Many of his manuscripts are now held by the Instituto Nacional de Estudios de Teatro, in Buenos Aires, and by the Museo Histórico de Morón, the city where he died at the age of 45.

Biography

In 1873, when he was only 17 years old, he went to Florence for further study and remained there until 1879. In 1877 he wrote  (Two Words to my Caste Brothers), a political pamphlet on the role of Afro Argentines in wider Argentine culture. Once back in Buenos Aires, he continued to study music, this time with Basilio Basili, and composed a funeral march in honor of José de San Martín (Argentina's national hero). Rolón himself conducted its premiere performance when San Martín's remains were repatriated to Argentina in 1880.

In the meantime, his musical career began to thrive. In 1881 he founded a music publishing company, Rolón y Oca, where he published many works by contemporary Argentine composers, and in 1885 he founded a social club for Afro Argentines. Two years later, he was appointed Professor of Music by Concejo Nacional de Educación. Amongst his students were Justin Clérice, Antonio Restano, Prudencio R. DenÍs, and Enrique García Velloso.

He also composed numerous waltzes, polkas, marches, and barcarolles (several of which were published in Florence during his time there). His sacred music included hymns, music for Holy Week (1893),  (1901 o 1902), and a Kyrie for three voices (1902), which was probably his last composition.

Rolón died in Morón, Buenos Aires on 13 May 1902 shortly before his 46th birthday and was buried in the Cementerio de La Recoleta in Buenos Aires. Many of his manuscripts were later donated by his children to the Museo Histórico de Morón. There are also some of his works at the Instituto Nacional de Estudios de Teatro, in Buenos Aires.

Notes and references

Sources

Baker, Theodore (1900/2008) "Clérice, Justin" in A Biographical Dictionary of Musicians. Read Books. .
Casares, Emilio, López-Calo, José, et al. (eds.) (1999). Madrid: . (in Spanish).
 Cirio, Norberto Pablo (2009). . Buenos Aires: Teseo.  (in Spanish).
Cortés, Eladio and Barrea-Marlys, Mirta (2003). "García Velloso, Enrique" in Encyclopedia of Latin American Theater. Westport CT: Greenwood Publishing Group. .
Crétel, Bernard (2008) "Justin Clérice", originally published in Opérette n° 119 (in French).
 de Estrada, Marcos (1979). Argentinos de origen africano. Buenos Aires: Universidad de Buenos Aires (in Spanish).  
 Gesualdo, Vicente (1961). . Buenos Aires: Beta (in Spanish).
Petriella, Dionisio and Sosa Miatello, Sara (eds.) (1976). Buenos Aires:  (in Spanish).
Parts of this article were translated from Zenón Rolón on the Spanish Wikipedia where the following further sources were given: 
Andrews, George Reid (1989). . Buenos Aires:  (in Spanish). Also available in English as The Afro-Argentines of Buenos Aires, 1800-1900, University of Wisconsin Press, 1980.
 García Acevedo, Mario (2002). Madrid: . Volume 9, p. 352 (in Spanish).

Afro-Argentine musicians
Argentine composers
1856 births
1902 deaths
Burials at La Recoleta Cemetery